Siren of Bagdad is a 1953 Technicolor fantasy adventure film produced by Sam Katzman and directed by Richard Quine set in the medieval Persian Empire. It stars Paul Henreid as a travelling Master magician who seeks to recover his troop of beautiful dancing girls who are to be sold into slavery. Patricia Medina portrays his love interest who seeks to overthrow the corrupt Grand Vizier with the magician's help.

Hans Conried plays the sidekick to Quine's magician, who is transformed into a beautiful blonde woman who spies and distracts the Grand Vizier while retaining Conried's voice.

Premise

Kazah the Great (Paul Henreid), a magician is traveling in Arabia with a circus.

Cast

 Paul Henreid as Kazah the Great
 Patricia Medina as Princess Zandi
 Hans Conried as Ben Ali
 Charles Lung as Sultan El Malid
 Laurette Luez as Orena
 Anne Dore as Leda
 George Keymas as Soradin
 Michael Fox as Telar
 Karl Davis as Morab 
 Carl Milletaire as Hamid

Production
Patricia Medina signed a three-picture contract with Sam Katzman, of which this was the first.

Filming started 3 September 1952.

It was Henreid's third swashbuckler for Katzman. The actor later recalled that Quine "wanted to do the film as a satire, a Chaplinesque burlesque of pirate films."

Reception
The movie had a successful preview which Henreid said "Every situation joke worked; the audience howled. I came out beaming, and producer Sam Katzman, Quine and I congratulated one another on the very funny picture."

He said Katzman's wife was the only one who did not think the film would be a success, saying "People who go to pirate pictures want just that, a pirate picture. They aren’t as sophisticated as this preview audience. They want their pictures to follow a strict formula. This picture pokes fun at the sacred formula—and I don’t think they’ll accept that." Henreid said "she was absolutely right. The picture was a flop! "

Comic book adaptation
 Eastern Color Movie Love #21 (June 1953)

References

External links

 
 
review of film at Variety
 
 

1953 films
1950s adventure comedy films
1950s historical comedy films
American adventure comedy films
American historical comedy films
Films directed by Richard Quine
Columbia Pictures films
Films set in Baghdad
Films adapted into comics
1953 comedy films
1950s English-language films
1950s American films